Rok, RoK or ROK may refer to:

Places
Republic of Korea, official English name for South Korea (UNDP country code ROK)
Republic of Kosovo, official name for Kosovo
Rök, a parish in Sweden

Organizations
ROK, IATA code for Rockhampton Airport
ROK, ticker symbol for Rockwell Automation 
Rok plc, a British construction company which collapsed in 2010

People
Andy "Rok" Guerrero, former guitarist of Flobots

Other uses
One of the names of Saint Roch in Croatian
Rok (given name), Slovene masculine name
Rok River, river of Sweden

See also
Roc (disambiguation)